Unification of Japan may refer to:
 Kofun period (250-538), when the nations and tribes of Japan gradually coalesced into a centralized empire
 Edo period when the Sengoku period ended and Japan united under the Tokugawa shogunate

National unifications